The eighty-seventh Minnesota Legislature was the legislature of the U.S. state of Minnesota from January 4, 2011, to January 7, 2013. It was composed of the Senate and the House of Representatives, based on the results of the 2010 Senate election and the 2010 House election. The seats were apportioned based on the 2000 United States census. It first convened in Saint Paul on January 4, 2011 and last met on August 24, 2012. It held its regular session from January 4 to May 23, 2011, and from January 24 to May 10, 2012. A special session was held on July 19 and 20, 2011, to complete the passage of budget bills. Another special session was held on August 24, 2012, to provide disaster assistance for the flooded areas of Duluth.

Major events 
 February 9, 2011: 2011 State of the State Address
 February 21, 2011: Joint session to elect regents of the University of Minnesota.
 February 14, 2012: 2012 State of the State Address

Major legislation 
The legislation listed here is taken from Hot List 2011 - 2012 Regular Session, which is, according to the website of the Minnesota Legislature "an unofficial listing of House and Senate files that have become somewhat to very well-known." This is not an exhaustive list of bills enacted, proposed, or vetoed during the 87th Minnesota Legislature, but rather a list of well-known legislation.

Enacted 
 May 25, 2011: An act proposing an amendment to the Minnesota Constitution recognizing marriage as only a union between one man and one woman
 February 23, 2012: Public safety; requiring community notification when a person is released from the Minnesota sex offender program
 April 5, 2012: An act proposing an amendment to the Minnesota Constitution requiring voters to present photographic identification
 April 9, 2012: An act authorizing county attorneys and assistant county attorneys to carry firearms on duty under the terms of a permit to carry
 April 18, 2012: Revisor Bill
 April 27, 2012: Omnibus Liquor Bill
 April 27, 2012: Omnibus Education Policy & Finance Bill
 April 28, 2012: Omnibus Agriculture Bill
 April 28, 2012: Omnibus Health & Human Services Finance Bill
 April 30, 2012: Omnibus Health & Human Services Policy Bill
 May 1, 2012: Omnibus Legacy Amendment Funding Bill
 May 3, 2012: Omnibus Environment Policy Bill
 May 3, 2012: Omnibus Game & Fish Bill
 May 10, 2012: Omnibus Pension Bill
 May 10, 2012: Omnibus Transportation Finance Bill
 May 10, 2012: Omnibus Data Practices Bill
 May 11, 2012: Omnibus Bonding Bill
 May 14, 2012: Omnibus Technical Tax Bill
 May 14, 2012: Viking stadium; provides for a National Football League Stadium in Minnesota funded by gambling revenue & more
 May 25, 2012: Omnibus Higher Education Bill

Vetoed 
Boldface indicates the act was passed by both houses.

 March 5, 2012: Firearms; allows use of firearm in self defense outside the permit holders home (/)
 April 5, 2012: Omnibus K-12 Bill (/)
 May 3, 2012: Teachers; school districts authorized to base leave of absence and discharge decisions on teacher evaluation outcomes (/)
 May 4, 2012: Omnibus Tax Bill (/)
 May 14, 2012: Omnibus Tax Bill (pocket veto) (/)

Summary of actions 
In the 87th Minnesota Legislature, a total of 258 out of 5,731 bills introduced were passed by the Senate and House of Representatives. All of the bills appearing on the Legislature's Hot List for the 87th Legislature were approved by Governor Mark Dayton, with the notable exceptions of H.F. No. 1467, an act that would have eliminated the duty to retreat with regard to the use of firearms in self-defense and instituted a stand-your-ground law while allowing the use of firearms in self-defense outside the permit holder's home; H.F. No. 2083, the omnibus K-12 bill; H.F. No. 1870, an act that would have authorized school districts to base leave of absence and discharge decisions on teacher evaluation outcomes; H.F. No. 2337, an omnibus tax bill; and H.F. No. 247, another omnibus tax bill, all of which were vetoed, except that H.F. No. 247 was the subject of a pocket veto rather than a regular veto.

In total, 55 acts were vetoed, including 23 passed during the 2011 regular session and 32 passed during the 2012 continuation of the regular session. None of the bills passed during either of the special sessions were vetoed. Two of the 32 vetoes of bills passed during the 2012 continuation were pocket vetoes. There were no line-item vetoes. No acts or items were enacted by the Legislature over the Governor's veto.

Political composition 
Resignations and new members are discussed in the "Membership changes" section, below.

Senate

House of Representatives

Leadership

Senate 
 President: Michelle Fischbach (R)
 President pro tempore: Gen Olson (R)

Majority (Republican) leadership 
 Majority Leader:
 Amy Koch (until December 15, 2011)
 David Senjem (from December 27, 2011)
 Deputy Majority Leader:
 Geoff Michel (until December 27, 2011)
 Julianne Ortman (from January 3, 2012)
 Assistant Majority Leaders:
 Roger Chamberlain (from December 27, 2011)
 Paul Gazelka (from December 27, 2011)
 David Hann (until December 27, 2011)
 Bill Ingebrigtsen (from January 3, 2012)
 Ted Lillie (from December 27, 2011)
 Doug Magnus (until December 27, 2011)
 Claire Robling (from December 27, 2011)
 David Senjem (until December 27, 2011)
 Dave Thompson (until December 27, 2011)
 Majority Whip:
 Chris Gerlach (until December 27, 2011)
 Ted Lillie (2012)
 Assistant Majority Whips (2012):
 John Carlson
 Al DeKruif
 Carla Nelson
 Pam Wolf

Minority (DFL) leadership 
 Minority Leader: Tom Bakk
 Assistant Minority Leader: Terri Bonoff

House of Representatives 
 Speaker: Kurt Zellers (R)
 Speakers pro tempore:
 Greg Davids (R)
 Mary Liz Holberg (R)
 Morrie Lanning (R)
 Torrey Westrom (R)

Majority (Republican) leadership 
 Majority Leader: Matt Dean
 Assistant Majority Leaders:
 Kurt Daudt
 Bob Gunther
 Joe Hoppe
 Tim Kelly
 Jenifer Loon
 Paul Torkelson
 Tim Sanders
 Ron Shimanski
 Majority Whip: Rod Hamilton

Minority (DFL) leadership 
 Minority Leader: Paul Thissen
 Deputy Minority Leader: Debra Hilstrom
 Assistant Minority Leaders:
 Kent Eken
 Rick Hansen
 Jeff Hayden (until October 25, 2011)
 Erin Murphy
 Kim Norton
 John Persell
 Steve Simon
 Minority Whips:
 Melissa Hortman
 Larry Hosch
 John Lesch
 Terry Morrow

Members

Senate

House of Representatives

Membership changes

Senate

House of Representatives

References

Majority and Minority Leaders of the Minnesota House of Representatives, 1901-present
Minnesota Legislators Past and Present, 87th Session
Results of Special Elections for the Minnesota Legislature, 1971-present
Party Control of the Minnesota Senate, 1951-present
Party Control of the Minnesota House of Representatives, 1951-present

87th
2011 in Minnesota
2012 in Minnesota
2011 U.S. legislative sessions
2012 U.S. legislative sessions